This is the discography of R&B/Hip hop soul trio, Total.

Albums

Studio albums

Singles

 Notes
 Did not chart on the Hot R&B/Hip-Hop Songs chart (Billboard rules at the time prevented album cuts from charting). Chart peak listed represents the Hot R&B/Hip-Hop Airplay chart.

Featured singles

Guest appearances

Soundtracks

Videography
 From Total (1996)
 No One Else
 No One Else (Puff Daddy Remix)
 Kissin' You
 Kissin' You / Oh Honey
 Can't You See
 Can't You See (Bad Boy Remix)
 Do You Think About Us
 From Kima, Keisha, and Pam (1998)
 Trippin'
 Sitting Home
 From Soul Food (soundtrack) (1997)
 What About Us? (1997)
 As Guest Artists
 LL Cool J - Loungin' (Who Do U Love?) (1995)
Notorious B.I.G. "Hypnotize" (Pam)
Notorious B.I.G "Juicy" (Keisha & Kima)
 Mase - What You Want (1997)
 Foxy Brown - I Can't (1998)
 Tony Touch - I Wonder Why (He's The Greatest DJ) (2000)
 Cameos
 Craig Mack - Flava In Ya Ear (Remix) (Keisha from Total) (1994)
 The Notorious B.I.G. - One More Chance/Stay With Me (1994)
Soul For Real - Every Little Thing I Do (1995)
 112 - Only You - Bad Boy Remix (Keisha from Total) (1996)
 Missy Elliott - The Rain (Supa Supa Fly) (1997)
 Jerome - Too Old For Me (Keisha from Total) (1997)
Lil' Kim - Not Tonight (Remix) (1997)
The Lox - We'll Always Love Big Poppa (1998)
The Bad Boy Family - You (2001) [Featuring Pam & Keisha]

References

Total discography
Hip hop discographies
Rhythm and blues discographies